Semagystia kamelini is a moth in the family Cossidae. It was described by Yakovlev in 2004. It is found in the Narym Mountains of Kazakhstan) and Kyrgyzstan.

References

Natural History Museum Lepidoptera generic names catalog

Cossinae
Moths described in 2004